Events in the year 1948 in Germany.

Events 

 March 1 - Bank deutscher Länder was founded.
 April 3 - Westdeutsche Allgemeine Zeitung is first published.
 April 5 - The 1948 Gatow air disaster was a mid-air collision in the airspace above Berlin, Germany that occurred on 5 April 1948.
 June 24 - The Berlin Blockade started.
 August 1 - German magazine Stern was founded.
 October 2 - Hessischer Rundfunk started.
 IG Farben Trial
 Krupp Trial
 Pohl trial

Births 
 January 16 - Gregor Gysi, German politician
 February 16 - Harald Range, German lawyer (died 2018)
 March 27 - Edgar Selge, German actor
 April 10 - Bernd Clüver, German singer (died 2011)
 April 12 - Joschka Fischer, German politician
 April 14 - Peter Urban, German radio journalist
 April 21 - Dieter Fromm, German athlete
 May 17 - Winfried Kretschmann, German politician
 May 25 - Klaus Meine, German singer
 May 31 - Jürgen Stark, German economist 
 June 6 - Jürgen Marcus, German singer (died 2018)
 June 8 
 Jürgen von der Lippe, German comedian and actor
 Hans-Josef Becker, German bishop of Roman Catholic Church
 June 20  - Johannes Friedrich, German Lutheran bishop
 June 30  - Wolf Erlbruch, German writer and children's book illustrator (died 2022)
 July 18 - Hartmut Michel, German biochemist, Nobel Prize in Chemistry laureate
 July 22 - Otto Waalkes, German comedian
 July 31 - Heinz Buschkowsky, German politician
 August 5 - Karlheinz Smieszek, German sport shooter
 September 1 - Jürgen Fitschen, German banker
 October 28 - Wolfgang Ritter, German biologist
 November 4 - Claus Richter, German journalist
 November 16 - Norbert Lammert, German politician
 November 23 - Gabriele Seyfert, German figure skater
 November 24 - Christoph Bergner, German politician
 December 2 
 Reinhard Höppner, German politician
 Christine Westermann, German journalist
 Gebhard Fürst, German bishop of Roman Catholic Church
 December 6 - Marius Müller-Westernhagen, German singer
 December 20 - Beatrice Richter, actress and comedian

Deaths 

 12 January - Albert Grzesinski, German politician (born 1879)
 5 February - Johannes Blaskowitz, German general (born 1898)
 9 February — Karl Valentin, German actor and comedian (born 1882)
 14 February - Conrad Gröber, German bishop of Roman Catholic Church (born 1872)
 16 February — Richard von Kühlmann, German diplomat and industrialist (born 1873)
 10 April - Wilhelm Külz, German politician (born 1875)
 2 May - Wilhelm von Opel, German automotive pioneer (born 1871)
 2 June - Karl Brandt, German physician (born 1904)
 25 June - Hans von Opel, German industrialist (born 1889)
 27 June - Wilhelm Sauter, German painter (born 1896)
 9 August — Hugo Boss, German fashion designer (born 1885)
 13 September - Paul Wegener, German actor (born 1874)
 3 October — Alois Wolfmüller, German engineer (born 1864)
 9 October — Alfred Roth, German politician and writer (born 1879)
 18 October - Walther von Brauchitsch, German field marshal (born 1881)
 25 October — Walter Bock, German chemist (born 1895)
 5 November - Hans Schrader, German archaeologist (born 1869)
 10 November - Julius Curtius, German politician (born 1877)
 28 November - Will Dohm, German actor (born 1897)

References

 
1940s in Germany
Years of the 20th century in Germany
Germany
Germany